= MYcroSchool =

MYcroSchool Charter High Schools

Location
- 6850 NW 11th Place, Suite B Gainesville, Florida 32608; Duval, Alachua, St. Petersburg, Florida

Information
- Type: Public Charter High School
- Motto: My School, My Way
- Established: 2001
- Age range: 16-24
- Colours: Orange and gray
- Accreditation: Cognia (SACS CASI)
- Website: www.mycroschool.org

MYcroSchool is a series of tuition-free public charter high schools in the U.S. state of Florida, which are owned and operated by NEWCorp, Inc. MYcroSchool is a nonprofit 501(c)3 organization that offers a standard high school diploma. MYcroSchool campuses are accredited by Cognia (SACS CASI).

NEWCorp serves five MYcroSchool programs. Three in Jacksonville, one in Gainesville, and one in St. Petersburg.
